The Awash (sometimes spelled Awaash; Oromo: Awaash, Amharic: አዋሽ, Afar: We'ayot, Somali: Webiga Dir) is a major river of Ethiopia. Its course is entirely contained within the boundaries of Ethiopia and empties into a chain of interconnected lakes that begin with Lake Gargori and end with Lake Abbe (or Abhe Bad) on the border with Djibouti, some 100 kilometres (60 or 70 miles) from the head of the Gulf of Tadjoura. It is the principal stream of an endorheic drainage basin covering parts of the Amhara, Oromia and Somali Regions, as well as the southern half of the Afar Region.

The Awash Valley (and especially the Middle Awash) is internationally famous for its high density of hominin fossils, offering unparalleled insight into the early evolution of humans. "Lucy", one of the most famous early hominin fossils, was discovered in the lower Awash Valley. For its paleontological and anthropological importance, the lower valley of the Awash was inscribed on the UNESCO World Heritage List in 1980.

Overview 

The Awash rises south of Mount Warqe, west of Addis Ababa in the woreda of Dandi, close to the town of Ginchi, West Shewa Zone, Oromia. After entering the bottom of the Great Rift Valley, the Awash flows south to loop around Mount Zuqualla in an easterly then northeasterly direction, before entering Koka Reservoir. There, water is used for the irrigation of sugar cane plantations. Downstream, the Awash passes the city of Adama and the Awash National Park. It is then joined on its left bank by its chief affluent, the Germama (or Kasam) River, before turning northeast at approximately 11° N 40° 30' E as far north as 12° before turning completely east to reach lake Gargori.

According to materials published by the Ethiopian Central Statistical Agency, the Awash River is 1200 kilometers long.

Other tributaries of the Awash include (in order upstream): the Logiya, Mille, Borkana, Ataye, Hawadi, Kabenna and Durkham Rivers. Towns and cities along its course include Metehara, Awash, Gewane and Asaita.

Paleontology 

Humans have lived in the valley of the Awash almost since the beginning of the species. Numerous pre-human hominid remains have been found in the Middle Awash. The remains found in the Awash Valley date from the late Miocene, Pliocene, and early Pleistocene (roughly 5.6-2.5 million years ago), and include fossils of many Australopithecines, including "Lucy", the most famous individual Australopithecus. Other extinct hominids discovered at the site include Homo erectus and Ardipithecus.

History 

The valley of the Awash from about 9° N downstream is the traditional home of the Afar people and Issa people. The valley of the Awash have been included as part of the  Fatagar, Ifat, and Shewa.

According to Huntingford, in the 16th century the Awash river was called the great Dir river and lay in the country of the Muslims.

The first European to trace the course of the Awash to its end in the Aussa oasis was Wilfred Thesiger in 1933/1934, who started at the city of Awash, followed the river's course to its final end in Lake Abhebad, and continued his expedition east to Tadjoura. (Although the explorer L.M. Nesbitt had followed parts of the course of the Awash in 1928, he turned away from the river at Asaita and proceeded north through the Afar Depression to the Red Sea.)

In 1960, the Koka Dam was completed across the Awash River at a point around 75 kilometers from Addis Ababa. With its opening, it became a major source of hydroelectric power in the area. The resulting freshwater lake, Lake Gelila (also known as the Koka Reservoir), has an area of about 180 square kilometers. Both lake and dam are threatened by increasing sedimentation.

The Awash International Bank is named for the Awash River.

Climate 
The climate of the Awash River Basin is mostly influenced by the movement of the intertropical convergence zone (ITCZ). During its movement northwards in March/April and its retreat southwards, ITCZ creates two rainy seasons, a shorter one around March ('Belg'), and a longer one between June and September ('Kiremt'), which partly fall into one longer rainy season. The rain-season tends to be bimodal towards eastern Ethiopia and almost unimodal towards western Ethiopia. The time between October and March is a dry season, called 'Bega'. Semi-arid to arid conditions prevail in the Rift Valley. In contrast, the highlands partly receive more than 1600 mm of rainfall in ca. six months per year.

Hydrology 
Groundwater recharge varies between values exceeding 350 mm per year in the upper highlands and no recharge at the bottom of the rift valley. Groundwater is predominantly recharged at the escarpments and highlands above 1900 m a.s.l., where annual rainfall is higher than 1000 mm. Localized small-scale recharge is also supposed to occur at the flanks of the rift valley volcanoes. Artificial groundwater recharge takes further place at irrigated plantations at the rift valley. Recharge from river channel losses and via infiltration from lakes plays a role in the Main Ethiopian Rift (MER) and in southern Afar.

Ecology 
Most of the Awash Basin is part of the Ethiopian montane forests ecoregion. At high altitudes the Ethiopian montane grasslands and woodlands and Ethiopian montane moorlands predominate. The Somali Acacia–Commiphora bushlands and thickets ecoregion occupies low elevations in the Rift.

The basin's vegetation has a strong anthropogenic impact. All over the upper and central Awash Basin, remains of different savanna types are still clearly visible. They range from thorn savannas in the lower rift, bush, grass and open savannas above 800 m and woody savannas on the escarpments and the highlands. Forestry hardly exists inside the Awash River Basin, with a few exceptions of small eucalyptus plantations. Outside of Awash National Park the open and woody savannas have been almost completely cultivated with crops. This especially accounts for all escarpment terraces. Thereby the scattered tree cover remained similar to the primary state of the savannas, while the grass layer has been replaced by crops. Only highest altitudes still show connected woodlands. Partly reforestation was carried out on not cultivable altitudes with secondary coniferous forests. The cultivated crops are (endemic) teff, maize, sorghum, beans and vegetables. Pastures hardly exist where agriculture is possible. The cattle graze on field edges and waysides and on steep escarpments. This is one major reason for erosion, because vegetation cover is partly destroyed. Stubble-grazing is a common practice in the Awash Basin.

Fauna 
The lower Awash valley is one of the last wildlife preserves for the African wild ass. The mammal is now extinct in Yangudi Rassa National Park, but still found in the adjacent Mille-Serdo Wildlife Reserve. Other large animals native to the area include Beisa Oryx, Soemmering's gazelle, Dorcas gazelle, gerenuk and Grevy's zebra. Crocodiles also flourish within the river.

See also 
 List of rivers of Ethiopia
 List of fossil sites (with link directory)
 List of hominina (hominid) fossils (with images)
 List of World Heritage Sites in Ethiopia

References

External links 

 The Middle Awash Project website

Further reading 
 Zewdu Tememew Molla, "Dam Safety Evaluation on Koka Dam, Ethiopia". M.Sc. thesis, 2005. abstract

 
Rivers of Ethiopia
Ethiopian Highlands
World Heritage Sites in Ethiopia
Great Rift Valley